Ianca is a commune in Olt County, Oltenia, Romania. It is composed of two villages, Ianca and Potelu.

See also
Oltenian Sahara

References

Communes in Olt County
Localities in Oltenia